Aravaipa, formerly Dunlap, a former populated place, on Arizona Gulch, a tributary of Deer Creek, tributary to Aravaipa Creek north of Klondyke in Graham County, Arizona.  Aravaipa lies at an elevation of 4596 feet.

History
Originally a ranch headquarters, named Dunlap after Burt Dunlap, the local rancher who established it in 1882.  Burt Dunlap was the postmaster of the post office from 1883 until 1892.  He also served several terms in the territorial legislature.  When it was found there was already a post office with the same name, the post office and town were renamed after the local Aravaipa Apache.  In 1893 the post office was closed.

Aravaipa's population was 17 in 1900, and 12 in 1920.

Aravaipa, a mining and ranching town, boasted a school, store, and a pool hall.  Today there are a few buildings and outhouses left.

References

Ghost towns in Arizona
Former populated places in Graham County, Arizona
History of Graham County, Arizona
1882 establishments in Arizona Territory